The Capture of Fort Bute signalled the opening of Spanish intervention in the American Revolutionary War on the side of France and the United States. Mustering an ad hoc army of Spanish regulars, Acadian militia, and native levies under Gilbert Antoine de St. Maxent, Bernardo de Gálvez, the Governor of Spanish Louisiana stormed and captured the small British frontier post on Bayou Manchac on September 7, 1779.

Background
Spain officially entered the American Revolutionary War on May 8, 1779, with a formal declaration of war by King Charles III.  This declaration was followed by another on July 8 that authorized his colonial subjects to engage in hostilities against the British.  When Bernardo de Gálvez, the colonial Governor of Spanish Louisiana, received word of this on July 21, he immediately began to secretly plan offensive operations.  Gálvez, who had been planning for the possibility of war since April, intercepted communications from the British at Pensacola indicating that the British were planning a surprise attack on New Orleans; he decided to launch his own attack first.  To that end, he concealed from the public his receipt of the second proclamation.

British defenses
Fort Bute was located on Bayou Manchac, about  up the Mississippi River from New Orleans, on the far western border of British West Florida.  Lieutenant Colonel Alexander Dickson was charged with the defense of the Baton Rouge district, which included Fort Bute, Baton Rouge, and Fort Panmure (modern Natchez, Mississippi).  The British had begun sending larger numbers of troops to the area following George Rogers Clark's capture of Vincennes, which had exposed the weak British defenses in the area.  At Dickson's disposal in August 1779 were 400 regulars, including companies from the 16th and 60th Regiments, a recently arrived company of grenadiers from the German state of Waldeck, and about 150 Loyalist militia.

Fort Bute was an older stockade fort built in 1766. It was in such disrepair that Dickson judged it to be indefensible.  When Dickson received word of Spanish movements, he withdrew most of his forces to Baton Rouge and Panmure, leaving a small garrison of 20 Waldeckers under Captain von Haake behind.

Spanish march

Gálvez originally planned to leave New Orleans on August 20.  However, a hurricane on August 18 swept over the town, sinking most of his fleet and destroying provisions.  Undeterred, Gálvez rallied the support of the colony and on August 27 set out by land toward Baton Rouge, using as an explanation for the movement the need to defend Spanish Louisiana from an expected British attack.  The force departing New Orleans consisted of 520 regulars, of whom about two-thirds were recent recruits, 60 militiamen, 80 free men of color, and ten American volunteers headed by Oliver Pollock.  As they marched upriver, the force grew by another 600 men, from Indians to Acadians.  At its peak, the force numbered over 1,400; but this number was reduced, due to the hardships of the march, by several hundred before they reached Fort Bute.

When the force neared Fort Bute on September 6, Gálvez informed them of the Spanish war declaration and the true purpose of their mission, eliciting cheers from the men.  At dawn the next day they attacked the fort, and after a brief skirmish in which one German was killed, most of the garrison surrendered.  The six who escaped capture made their way to Baton Rouge to notify Dickson.

Aftermath
Gálvez remained at Fort Bute for six days, giving his men time to rest, before moving on to Baton Rouge, which fell after a short siege on September 21.  The terms of capitulation agreed to by Dickson at Baton Rouge secured for Gálvez the surrender of the remaining British outposts on the Mississippi River.

Gálvez then returned to New Orleans and began planning a campaign against Mobile and Pensacola, the remaining British strongholds in West Florida.

See also
Battle of Baton Rouge (1779)
Fort New Richmond

Notes

References

Louisiana in the American Revolution
Fort Bute
Fort Bute
Fort Bute
1779 in the United States
Conflicts in 1779
East Baton Rouge Parish, Louisiana